Bombay is a 1995 Indian Tamil-language romantic drama film written and directed by Mani Ratnam, starring Arvind Swamy and Manisha Koirala. The film tells the story of an inter-religious family in Bombay before and during the Bombay riots, which took place between December 1992 and January 1993 after the demolition of the Babri Masjid led to religious tensions between Hindu and Muslim communities. It is the second installment in Ratnam's trilogy of films that depict human relationships against a background of Indian politics, including Roja (1992) and Dil Se.. (1998).

Bombay was released on 10 March 1995. The film was well-received both critically and commercially successful. It was screened at many international film festivals including the Philadelphia Film Festival in 1996. The film's soundtrack earned composer A. R. Rahman his fourth consecutive Filmfare Best Music Director Award (Tamil), and is considered one of the greatest Indian soundtracks of all time. However, the film caused considerable controversy upon release in India and abroad for its depiction of inter-religious relations between a Muslim woman and a Hindu man. The film was banned in Singapore and Malaysia upon release.

In July 2005, a book on the film by Lalitha Gopalan was published by BFI Modern Classics, looking at the film's production, the several issues it covered, and its impact upon release in India and abroad. The film was ranked among the top 20 Indian films in the British Film Institute's rankings.

Plot 
Shekhar is the son of an orthodox Hindu Narayana Pillai living in a coastal village in Tamil Nadu. A journalism student studying in Bombay, Shekhar visits home to be with his family. On one of his return trips, he notices Shaila Banu, a Muslim schoolgirl in the village and falls in love with her. Initially shy, Shaila seeks to distance herself from Shekhar, but after frequent run-ins, and days of pursuit, Shaila begins to like Shekhar. Eventually, they both fall in love.

Shekhar meets Shaila's father Basheer and says he wants to marry Shaila. Basheer refuses, citing difference in religions. Shekhar reveals his interest to his father, who becomes angry, meets Basheer and gets into an abusive argument with him. Upset with rejection from both families, Shekhar returns to Bombay. Through a friend of hers, he sends Shaila a letter and a ticket for her to travel to Bombay. However, she is undecided; Basheer learns of her regular letters from Shekhar and plans to marry her off to stop this relation growing further. Left with no choice, Shaila leaves the village with the ticket and reaches Bombay.

Shekhar and Shaila marry and lead a happy life. In a year, Shaila conceives and delivers twin boys who are named Kabir Narayan and Kamal Basheer. The twins are raised in both religions. Shekhar continues to work as a journalist, while Shaila takes care of home and children. In six years, Shekhar and Shaila firmly settle down in their life and begin the process of re-establishing a relationship with their respective families.

When the Babri Masjid is demolished on 6 December 1992, riots break out in Bombay. Kabir and Kamal, who had gone to buy groceries, get caught in the riots; eventually, Shekhar and Shaila save them and reach home safely. Narayana Pillai, who receives the news of the riots, rushes to Bombay to meet his son and his family. He reconciles with his son and everyone is happy with his arrival, and he stays with them. Soon, Basheer also comes with his wife and all of them live together happily for a few days. Both Pillai and Basheer are happy with their grandchildren, try to get both to their religion and wish to be with them.

On 8 January 1993, when two murders are propagated as communal killings, another riot breaks out in Bombay, raising tensions between religious communities. Hindus and Muslims clash in the streets, resulting in hundreds of deaths on both sides. During the conflict, arsonists set fire to the apartment where Shekhar lives with his family. Shekhar tries to evacuate everyone, but Narayana Pillai, Basheer and his wife fail to escape in time and are killed when the building explodes. In the confusion of the panicking crowds, Kamal and Kabir are separated from their parents.

Kamal is saved by a transgender woman who cares for him and protects him, while Kabir searches aimlessly for his brother. Shekhar and Shaila begin to search for them and they go through several tense moments, as they check the morgues and hospitals for their children. Shekhar grows emotional and participates in the movement to stop the riots with other moderate religious leaders, ultimately succeeding. When the riots end, Shaila and Shekhar are reunited with their children tearfully as the people on the streets join hands, regardless of age or religion.

Cast 
Credits adapted from Conversations with Mani Ratnam:

 Arvind Swamy as Shekhar Narayanan Pillai
 Manisha Koirala as Shaila Banu
 Nassar as Narayanan Pillai, Shekhar's father
 Kitty as Basheer
 Tinnu Anand as the Sakthi Samaj Head
 Akash Khurana as a fanatical Muslim leader
 Master Harsha (Sumeet) as Kabir Narayan
 Master Hridhay as Kamal Basheer
 A. R. Srinivasan as Police officer
 Crazy Venkatesh as Servant
 Prakash Raj as Kumar
 Rallapalli as a transgender woman 
 M. V. Vasudeva Rao
 Pramoth as Periya Thambi
 Vijaya Chandrika as Visalam
 Radhabhai as Pankajam
 Sujitha in a special appearance

Additionally, Sonali Bendre and Nagendra Prasad appear in the item number "Humma Humma".

Production 

During the recording of the background score of Mani Ratnam's Thiruda Thiruda (1993), the Bombay riots broke out. Mani Ratnam planned on making a film in Malayalam about a boy who gets lost in the riots, and requested M. T. Vasudevan Nair to write the script. This was supposed to be Mani Ratnam's second Malayalam film after Unaroo (1985). But since the idea did not materialise, he decided to make it in Tamil as the film that would later be titled Bombay. According to Ratnam, Bombay was not originally planned as a political film: "It was a phase India was going through and these things affected me and found their way into my work."

Aishwarya Rai was considered for the female lead, but she opted out due to unavailability of dates, with the production of the film clashing with her Miss World pageant, a title she went on to win. Mani Ratnam held a photo shoot for the film with Vikram and Manisha Koirala, but eventually did not choose Vikram as he was unwilling to shave his beard and long hair that he had grown for the production of another film during the period, Pudhiya Mannargal (1994); the role went to Arvind Swamy. Koirala has stated that, though some people advised her against accepting the project since she had to play a mother, she did not listen as there were others "it'll be foolish to refuse a Mani Ratnam film". Koirala's voice was dubbed by Rohini. Nassar, a Muslim in real life, was cast as the father of Swamy's character (a Hindu) while Kitty, a Hindu in real life, was cast as the father of Koirala's character (a Muslim). Ratnam deliberately cast them in those roles as a statement.

When Ratnam approached cinematographer Rajiv Menon to shoot Bombay, he described it as a film about the riots and said that he (Menon) needed to "(make what came before) the riots as beautiful as possible". So, Menon suggested shooting in the rains to achieve the effect. They shot the interiors of homes in Pollachi in Tamil Nadu and the exteriors were shot in Kasaragod, and Kannur village in Kerala. The song "Kannalane" was shot at Thirumalai Nayakkar Mahal, and "Uyire" was shot at Bekal Fort. The demolition of the Babri Masjid was shown onscreen through newspaper headlines and photographs, as the Censor Board did not want the makers to show the actual destruction.

Themes and influences 
Mani Ratnam described Bombay as "a positive film about communal harmony". He said the Bombay riots were not the main focus of the film, but "a helpless, innocent man caught up in violence not of his own making." The film is the second installment in Ratnam's trilogy of films that depict human relationships against a background of Indian politics, including Roja (1992) and Dil Se.. (1998). Bangalore Mirror compared it to the theme of the 1990 movie Come See the Paradise.

Soundtrack 

The soundtrack album for Bombay was composed by A. R. Rahman, in his third collaboration with Mani Ratnam after Roja and Thiruda Thiruda. The lyrics for the Tamil version were written by Vairamuthu, except for the song "Antha Arabi Kadaloram", which was written by Vaali. The soundtrack of the film became one of the best-selling Indian music albums of all time, with sales of 15million units. The soundtrack was included in The Guardian'''s "1000 Albums to Hear Before You Die" list, and the song "Kannalanae" sung by K. S. Chithra was included in their "1000 Songs Everyone Must Hear" list. "Bombay Theme" has appeared in various international films and music compilations, while the songs "Kannalanae" and "Bombay Theme" have been sampled by various international artists.

 Release Bombay was released on 10 March 1995. The Telugu-dubbed version was released on the same day. It was previously scheduled to release in January 1995, during Pongal. The film caused considerable controversy upon release in India and abroad for its depiction of inter-religious relations between a Muslim woman and a Hindu man. The film was banned in Singapore and Malaysia upon release. Two homemade bombs were thrown at the house of Mani Ratnam, who had to be hospitalised with shrapnel injuries.

 Reception 
 Box office 
The Hindi version of the film grossed , as reported by Box Office India, making it one of the year's ten highest-grossing Hindi films.

 Critical reception Ananda Vikatan, in a review dated 19 March 1995, rated the film 53 out of 100. Anand Kannan, writing for Planet Bollywood, said, "I wouldn't call this the best of Mani Ratnam [...] But good acting, a socially conscious theme and a quick pace make the movie well worth watching." In 1996, American critic James Berardinelli rated the film 3.5 out of 4 and said, "Largely because of their limited North American appeal and dubious quality, Indian movies are routinely ignored by distributors [...] Occasionally, however, a worthwhile picture causes enough people to take notice that it becomes a favorite on the international film festival circuit. One such movie is Bombay, the fourteenth feature from celebrated director Mani Rathnam." He concluded, "Director Rathnam has shown great courage in making this picture (bombs were thrown at his house after it opened in India), which speaks with a voice that many will not wish to hear. Bombay recalls how forceful a motion picture can be." R. P. R. of Kalki'' wrote that with far cry from average cinema, this film raises a thousand questions about social morality, not just Mani Ratnam; It has given every Indian a chance to be proud.

Accolades

Bibliography

Notes

References

External links 

 

1990s Tamil-language films
1995 films
1995 romantic drama films
Best Film on National Integration National Film Award winners
Fictional portrayals of the Maharashtra Police
Films about religious violence in India
Films directed by Mani Ratnam
Films scored by A. R. Rahman
Films set in 1992
Films set in 1993
Films set in Mumbai
Films shot in Kannur
Films shot in Kerala
Films shot in Madurai
Films shot in Mumbai
Films whose editor won the Best Film Editing National Award
Indian interfaith romance films
Indian romantic drama films